Hyphydrini is a tribe of predaceous diving beetles in the family Dytiscidae. There are about 16 genera and more than 390 described species in Hyphydrini.

Genera
These 16 genera belong to the tribe Hyphydrini:

 Agnoshydrus Biström, Nilsson & Wewalka, 1997
 Allopachria Zimmermann, 1924
 Andex Sharp, 1882
 Anginopachria Wewalka, Balke & Hendrich, 2001
 Coelhydrus Sharp, 1882
 Darwinhydrus Sharp, 1882
 Desmopachria Babington, 1841
 Dimitshydrus Uéno, 1996
 Heterhydrus Fairmaire, 1869
 Hovahydrus Biström, 1982
 Hydropeplus Sharp, 1882
 Hyphovatus Wewalka & Biström, 1994
 Hyphydrus Illiger, 1802
 Microdytes J. Balfour-Browne, 1946
 Pachydrus Sharp, 1882
 Primospes Sharp, 1882

References

Further reading

 
 
 
 
 

Dytiscidae
Articles created by Qbugbot